Ꞥ (lowercase ꞥ) is a letter derived from the combination of the Latin letter N and a stroke diacritic. Until 1921, it was used in Latvian orthography to represent the hard palatal nasal /ɲ/. It was replaced by Ņ (N with a cedilla).

It is represented in Unicode by:

Citations

German NB, Proposal to encode 10 Latin letters for pre-1921 Latvian orthography, 30 April 2009.

Latin-script letters
Latvian language